Rod Hebron (born 7 July 1942) is a Canadian former alpine skier who competed in the 1964 Winter Olympics and 1968 Winter Olympics.

References

External links
 sports-reference.com

1942 births
Living people
Canadian male alpine skiers
Olympic alpine skiers of Canada
Alpine skiers at the 1964 Winter Olympics
Alpine skiers at the 1968 Winter Olympics